Wang Jianfeng (born April 1970) is a former Chinese politician who spent his entire career in northwest China's Qinghai province. As of September 2021 he was under investigation by China's top anti-corruption agency. Previously he served as party secretary of Haixi Mongol and Tibetan Autonomous Prefecture.

Biography
Born in Longkou, Shandong, in April 1970, Wang graduated from Northwestern Polytechnical University.

He entered the workforce in April 1989, and joined the Communist Party of China in June 1993. Wang started his politic career in Chengzhong District of Xining, capital of Qinghai province. He served in the General Office of Xining Municipal Government for eight years, ultimately being appointed director in April 2003. He became governor of Chengbei District, in January 2008, and then party secretary, the top political position in the district, beginning in July 2001. He was appointed vice mayor of Xining in August 2014 and four years later was admitted to member of the standing committee of the CPC Xining Provincial Committee, the city's top authority. In July 2020 he became the deputy party secretary of Haixi Mongol and Tibetan Autonomous Prefecture, rising to party secretary the next year. He also served as party secretary of Golmud from July 2020 to April 2021. He concurrently served as party secretary of Qaidam Circular Economy Experimental Zone, one of the first thirteen pilot parks of circular economy industry in China.

Downfall
On 10 September 2021, he has been placed under investigation for "serious violations of laws and regulations" by the Central Commission for Discipline Inspection (CCDI), the party's internal disciplinary body, and the National Supervisory Commission, the highest anti-corruption agency of China. His predecessor Wen Guodong surrendered himself to the anti-corruption agency of China in September 2020.

References

1970 births
Living people
People from Yantai
Northwestern Polytechnical University alumni
People's Republic of China politicians from Shandong
Chinese Communist Party politicians from Shandong